Jaikó (Jeicó, Jeikó, Yeico, Geico, Eyco) is an extinct language of southeastern Piauí, Brazil.

Classification
Based on a 67-word list from the 19th century in von Martius (1867, v. 2, p. 143), it appears to be a Jê language.

However, Ramirez et al. (2015: 260–261) doubts the accuracy of von Martius' list, and notes that the word list may actually consist of a wide mixture of languages spoken in Piauí, including from Pimenteira (Cariban) and Masakará (Kamakã). Nevertheless, Nikulin (2020) still finds convincing evidence that Jaikó was a Macro-Jê language, but does not consider it to be within the Jê branch.

Distribution
Jaikó was spoken around the aldeia (village) of Cajueiro, located in what is now southeastern Piauí state. The name is derived from the town of Jaicós, which was located in the Jaikó people's territory around the Canindé River and Gurgueia River.

Word list
The full Geicó word list from von Martius (1867), with both the original Latin glosses and translated English glosses, is reproduced below.

References

Unclassified languages of South America
Jê languages
Extinct languages of South America
Languages extinct in the 19th century